Affan Khan is an Indian former television child actor. He is known for his portrayal of Ratan Maan Singh in Sony TV's Pehredaar Piya Ki and Roop in Colors TV's Roop - Mard Ka Naya Swaroop.

Career
Before starting his acting career, Khan had appeared in a TV commercial for Pepsodent. He first appeared on television when he played the role of Danish in the Episode 3 of Darr Sabko Lagta Hai. In 2017, he played the lead role in Pehredaar Piya Ki as Ratan Maan Singh. After the show ended, he was cast in the Netflix web series Sacred Games as Young Sartaj Singh.

In 2018, he landed the role of Roop in Colors TV's Roop - Mard Ka Naya Swaroop.

Personal life
Affan was born in 2007 to father Jameel Khan in Bangalore, India. He has two siblings Arsalan and Ifrah Khan.

Filmography

References

External links 
 

2007 births
Living people
Indian television male child actors
21st-century Indian male child actors